Public broadcasting institutions in Indonesia (abbreviated as LPP) currently consists of three separate entities: Radio Republik Indonesia (RRI), Televisi Republik Indonesia (TVRI), and local public broadcasting institutions (Lembaga Penyiaran Publik Lokal or LPPL). This classification is based on Act No. 32 of 2002 on Broadcasting (Undang-Undang Nomor 32 Tahun 2002 tentang Penyiaran) and followed by Government Regulation No. 11 of 2005 on Broadcasting Provision of Public Broadcasting Institution (Peraturan Pemerintah Nomor 11 Tahun 2005 tentang Penyelenggaraan Penyiaran Lembaga Penyiaran Publik).

According to Act No. 32 of 2002, a "public broadcasting institution" is defined as a "legal entity established by the state; independent, neutral, not commercial; and function to provide services for the public benefit".

Funding for the broadcasters, according to Act No. 32 of 2002, comes from several sources such as broadcasting fee, annual state budget, community contribution and advertisement, as well as other legal efforts related to their broadcasting operation. While annual budget appropriation for RRI and TVRI are approved by national government and parliament (DPR), annual budget for LPPL are approved by the respective local government and local parliament. RRI and TVRI funding sources outside of the annual budget currently are classified as "non-tax state revenue" and regulated in government regulations.

National broadcasters 

The national-scale public broadcasters were RRI, the national radio network, and TVRI, the national television network.

RRI and TVRI were originally set up as corporations separate from the central government, then included as part of the Department of Information (Departemen Penerangan) in 1946 and 1975, respectively. Concerns about repositioning RRI and TVRI as public broadcasters were rising after the Reformation until the department was dissolved in 2000 during Abdurrahman Wahid administration and they were removed gradually from direct governmental control (the department later reestablished into the current form of Ministry of Communication and Informatics). RRI and TVRI were set up as a service corporation (Perusahaan Jawatan or Perjan) under Ministry of Finance in the same year (TVRI was later set up again as a state-owned enterprise in 2002) and officially became independent public service broadcasters in 2005.

 RRI was established on 11 September 1945. RRI currently operates four radio networks (RRI Pro 1, RRI Pro 2, RRI Pro 3, and RRI Pro 4) carried by some or all of its 90 local stations; RRI Pro 3 itself is a centralized programming network. RRI also operates international radio service Voice of Indonesia.

 TVRI went on air publicly on 24 August 1962 (the opening day of the 1962 Asian Games), following a trial broadcast during the 1962 Indonesian Independence Day. TVRI operates three national television channels (TVRI, TVRI World, and TVRI Sport), as well as 32 regional stations across the country.

A proposed new act on broadcasting currently in the making would merge RRI with TVRI into RTRI (Radio Televisi Republik Indonesia, Radio Television of the Republic of Indonesia).

Local broadcasters 

The local public broadcasting institutions (LPPL) refers to local public broadcasters which is not owned and operated by either RRI or TVRI. The broadcasters were sometimes, but not always, located in a cities, regencies, or even provinces that don't yet have any RRI and/or TVRI station. According to Government Regulation No. 11 of 2005, these broadcasters are obligated to network with RRI (for radio station) and TVRI (for television station).

Before the reformation, there were several radio stations owned and operated by either city or regency government. These stations were known as Local Government Broadcast Radio (Radio Siaran Pemerintah Daerah or RSPD). Example stations included RSPD Top FM in Sukoharjo, Central Java and RSPD Berau in Berau, East Kalimantan which first broadcast in 1968 and 1975, respectively. Local government-owned television stations were none since all government-owned television matter, even local stations (which commonly located in the province's capital), was undertaken by TVRI. Act No. 32 of 2002 introduced the "local public broadcasting institutions" term, intended to transforming local government media into public ones; Government Regulation No. 11 of 2005 later regulates the institution. 

Currently there are a number of local public broadcasters union in the country, such as
All-Indonesia Radio and Television LPPL Association (Asosiasi LPPL Radio dan Televisi Se-Indonesia) which was formed in 2018 and Indonesian Local Public Radio and TV Association (Persatuan Radio TV Publik Daerah se-Indonesia, branded as Persada.id or Indonesiapersada.id) which was formed in 2019.

Criticism 
Apni Jaya Putra, a former Director of News and Programming at TVRI, said that the "public broadcasting institution" status is unknown in Indonesian state-established agency structure. The structure approximate to the status is "public service agency" (badan layanan umum or BLU), but to this day there are no further regulation regarding the current status.

See also 
 Media in Indonesia

References 

 
Broadcasting in Indonesia
Government agencies of Indonesia